Untie Yourself is the debut studio album by South African rock band Taxi Violence, released in 2006.

Reception 

Untie Yourself has mainly received positive reviews. Music Industry Online called the album fresh yet not unique, saying, "the album came across both as an exercise in paying homage to, and as a genuine addition to, the rock oeuvre"

Track listing

References

2006 debut albums
Taxi Violence albums